The Copyright Act of 1790 was the first federal copyright act to be instituted in the United States, though most of the states had passed various legislation securing copyrights in the years immediately following the Revolutionary War. The stated object of the act was the "encouragement of learning," and it achieved this by securing authors the "sole right and liberty of printing, reprinting, publishing and vending" the copies of their "maps, charts, and books" for a term of 14 years, with the right to renew for one additional 14-year term should the copyright holder still be alive.

Early developments 
The 1710 British Statute of Anne did not apply to the American colonies. The colonies' economy was largely agrarian, hence copyright law was not a priority, resulting in only three private copyright acts being passed in America prior to 1783. Two of the acts were limited to seven years, the other was limited to a term of five years. In 1783 a committee of the Continental Congress concluded "that nothing is more properly a man's own an the fruit of his study, and that the protection and security of literary property would greatly tends to encourage genius and to promote useful discoveries." But under the Articles of Confederation, the Continental Congress had no authority to issue copyright; instead it passed a resolution encouraging the States to "secure to the authors or publishers of any new book not hitherto printed... the copy right of such books for a certain time not less than fourteen years from the first publication; and to secure to the said authors, if they shall survive the term first mentioned,... the copy right of such books for another term of time no less than fourteen years". Three states had already enacted copyright statutes in 1783 prior to the Continental Congress resolution, and in the subsequent three years all of the remaining states except Delaware passed a copyright statute. Seven of the States followed the Statute of Anne and the Continental Congress' resolution by providing two fourteen-year terms. The five remaining States granted copyright for single terms of fourteen, twenty and twenty-one years, with no right of renewal.

At the Constitutional Convention 1787 both James Madison of Virginia and Charles C. Pinckney of South Carolina submitted proposals that would allow Congress the power to grant copyright for a limited time. These proposals are the origin of the Copyright Clause in the United States Constitution, which allows the granting of copyright and patents for a limited time to serve a utilitarian function, namely "to promote the progress of science and useful arts".

Legislative history
During the first session of the 1st United States Congress in 1789, the House of Representatives considered enacting a copyright law. The historian Davit Ramsay petitioned Congress seeking to restrict the publication of his History of the American Revolution on April 15. Congressmen Thomas Tudor Tucker, Alexander White, and Benjamin Huntington examined his claims and a copyright committee consisting of Huntington, Lambert Cadwalader, and Benjamin Contee began drafting the legislation on April 20. Jedidiah Morse, Nicholas Pike, and Hannah Adams each also petitioned Congress with their interests in restricting the printing of texts. Their bill moved to the Committee of the Whole House in June, but the matter was postponed in anticipation of the first recess, to be taken up again when the House reconvened.

Both houses of Congress pursued a copyright law more pointedly during 1790's second session. They responded to President George Washington's 1790 State of the Union Address, in which he urged Congress to pass legislation designed for "the promotion of Science and Literature" so as to better educate the public. This led to the Patent Act of 1790 and, shortly thereafter, the Copyright Act of 1790.

House of Representatives
The scope of what works would be covered by the law's exclusivity was contended in the House. When he reintroduced the matter, Aedanus Burke wanted to establish a first law about copyright regarding "literary property," but Alexander White called for the expansion of copyright beyond writings on the behalf of Jedidiah Morse, who believed unauthorized copying of his American Geography would hurt his business.

The need to re-raise the copyright issue, among other items left unresolved at the end of the first session, required the House to clarify some order of business problems over whether or not they could reopen unfinished business from a previous session. That settled, the House established a drafting committee for the law on February 1, chaired by Abraham Baldwin.

Eventually, the House passed a copyright bill and passed it to the Senate.

Senate
The Senate also deliberated on Copyright after the President's speech. On May 14, the Senate passed an amended version of the bill sent to them by the House. The House accepted their amendment on May 18 and the bill passed to the President.

The Act
The bill was signed into law on May 31, 1790 by George Washington and published in its entirety throughout the country shortly after. The Act granted copyright for a term of "fourteen years from the time of recording the title thereof", with a right of renewal for another fourteen years if the author survived to the end of the first term. It restricted books, maps, and charts. Although musical compositions were not mentioned in the text of the act, and would not be expressly covered by copyright until the Copyright Act of 1831, they were routinely registered under the 1790 Act as "books". The Act also did not mention paintings or drawings, which were not covered until the enactment of the Copyright Act of 1870.

Provisions 
The Act was copied almost verbatim from the 1709 British Statute of Anne. The first sentences of the two laws are almost identical. Both require registration in order for a work to receive copyright protection; similarly, both require that copies of the work be deposited in officially designated repositories such as the Library of Congress in the United States, and the Oxford and Cambridge universities in the United Kingdom. The Statute of Anne and the Copyright Act of 1790 both provided for an initial term of 14 years, renewable once by living authors for an additional 14 years, for works not yet published. The Statute of Anne differed from the 1790 Act, however, in providing a 21-year term of restriction, with no option for renewal, for works already published at the time the law went into effect (1710). The 1790 Act only offered a 14-year term for previously published works.

Geographic reach 
The Copyright Act of 1790 applied exclusively to citizens of the United States; works created outside the United States or by people who were not U.S. citizens were not copyrightable in the U.S. until the International Copyright Act of 1891. Consequently, various foreign authors, such as Charles Dickens, complained about not receiving royalty payments for copies of their work sold in the U.S.

Federal law 
At the time, works only received protection under federal statutory copyright if the statutory formalities, such as a proper copyright notice, were satisfied. If this was not the case, the work immediately entered into the public domain. In 1834 the Supreme Court ruled in Wheaton v. Peters, a case similar to the British Donaldson v Beckett of 1774, that although the author of an unpublished work had a common law right to control the first publication of that work, the author did not have a common law right to control reproduction following the first publication of the work.

Amendments 
The Act was first amended on April 29, 1802, extending copyright restriction to etchings and, for the first time, requiring notice of copyright registration on copies of the works. The Act did not specify a consequence of failing to include that notice; however, the federal case Ewer v. Coxe established that the failure to include notice invalidated a copyright.

The Act was also amended on February 15, 1819 to expand the jurisdiction of circuit courts (analogous to today's district courts) to allow them to hear cases on patents and copyrights.

See also
History of copyright law
Copyright law of the United States

References

External links

Full Text of the 1790 Act
Image of 1790 Act 
The Statute of Anne

1790 in American law
United States federal copyright legislation
1790 in the United States
Acts of the 1st United States Congress
History of copyright law